Collegiate High School may refer to:

Collegiate High School (Lakeland, Florida), a school on the Polk State College in Florida, USA
Collegiate High School at Northwest Florida State College, a school in Niceville, Florida, USA
Collegiate School of Medicine and Bioscience, a school in St. Louis, Missouri, USA